Daniel "Danny" Baggish (born 19 August 1983) is a Guamanian–born American professional darts player. He had a PDC tour card from 2021 to 2022, after being the only American player to win one at Q-School in 2021. He is a sponsored by Target Darts, and has been a member of Team Target since 2019.

Career 
He first came to prominence in 2019, when he was one of 8 North American qualifiers who played in the 2019 US Darts Masters, where he lost 6–1 to Daryl Gurney in the first round. He went on to defeat Elliot Milk and Leonard Gates, before beating Jeff Smith in the final of the North American Championship, which meant he qualified for the 2020 PDC World Darts Championship.

He then won a CDC Pro Tour event in Philadelphia, defeating Joe Huffman in the final.

Baggish became the first American player to qualify for a PDC European Tour event by qualifying for the 2022 German Darts Grand Prix. At the tournament, he beat Thomas Junghans to become the first American to win a European Tour game.

World Championship results

PDC
 2020: Second round (lost to Nathan Aspinall 1–3)
 2021: Third round (lost to Glen Durrant 2–4)
 2023: Second round (lost to Mervyn King 2–3)

Performance timeline

References

External links

1983 births
Living people
American darts players
Guamanian darts players
Professional Darts Corporation former tour card holders